Card of Darkness is a strategy, adventure and puzzle game developed by Zach Gage, Pendleton Ward and Choice Provisions, and released for Apple Arcade on September 19, 2019. The objective is to traverse dungeons and save the world using card game-style gameplay.

Reception 
The game received positive reviews from critics.

Sergio Velasquez of TouchArcade rated the game 4.5/5 stars, calling it a "fantastic game" with "simple, yet addictive gameplay", saying that the only "annoyance" was the game's randomly generated dungeons. Giorgio Melani of Multiplayer.it rated the game 8.5/10, praising its game mechanics and graphics.

Chris Plante of Polygon called the game "difficult", but said that it consumed his free time, also saying that it "excels in being easily readable". Gita Jackson of Kotaku stated that the game had the same appeal as Adventure Time, praising its simple story, which "frees up brainspace for understanding the complicated gameplay".

References 

2019 video games
IOS games
IOS-only games
Strategy video games
Single-player video games
Apple Arcade games
Adventure games
Puzzle video games
Video games developed in the United States
Video games designed by Zach Gage
Choice Provisions games